"You, No One but You" is a song by Frankie Laine from his 1967 album I Wanted Someone to Love.

Charts

References 

Frankie Laine songs